Opisthograptis is a genus of moths in the family Geometridae erected by Jacob Hübner in 1823.

Species
Opisthograptis inornataria (Leech, 1897)
Opisthograptis irrorata (Hampson, 1895)
Opisthograptis luteolata (Linnaeus, 1758)
Opisthograptis moelleri Warren, 1893
Opisthograptis punctilineata Wileman, 1910
Opisthograptis rumiformis (Hampson, 1902)
Opisthograptis sulphurea (Butler, 1880)
Opisthograptis swanni Prout, 1923
Opisthograptis tridentifera (Moore, 1888)
Opisthograptis trimacularia (Leech, 1897)
Opisthograptis tsekuna Wehrli, 1940

References
 

Ourapterygini
Taxa named by Jacob Hübner